"Before You Love Me" is a song by Russian singer Alsou, her first single released from her first album, Alsou. It was released on April 30, 2001, in Australia and the United Kingdom, and a few weeks later in May 2001 in various countries throughout Europe.

The single failed to chart in Australia. In the United Kingdom it peaked at number twenty-seven.

A lack of promotional support from Alsou's record company meant that no further releases occurred in either Australia or the United Kingdom, with the impending release of the Alsou album cancelled in both regions. The single was, however, effective in producing the hype it needed throughout Europe for the album to be released and proper promotion to take place.

Track listing
Australian/UK CD Single
 "Before You Love Me" (Radio Mix) — 2:57
 "Before You Love Me" (Sunship Vocal Mix) — 5:22
 "Before You Love Me" (Sleazesisters Anthem Mix) — 6:47
 "Before You Love Me" (Video) — 2:53

UK cassette Single
 "Before You Love Me" (Radio Mix)
 "Before You Love Me" (Secret Agents Remix)

German CD Single
 "Before You Love Me" (Radio Mix) — 3.00
 "Before You Love Me" (Remix by Frank Johnes and Tom Remm for Musicago-Studio) - 3.11
 "Before You Love Me" (Sunship Vocal Mix) — 5:20
 "Before You Love Me" (Sleazesisters Anthem Mix) — 6:46

Charts

References

2001 singles
Alsou Abramova songs
Music videos directed by Tim Royes
English-language Russian songs
Songs written by Martin M. Larsson
Songs written by Lars Halvor Jensen
Universal Music Group singles
2001 songs